The Landkreuzer P 1500 Monster was a purported German pre-prototype super-heavy self-propelled gun designed during World War II. While mentioned in some popular works, there is no solid documentation for the program’s existence, and it may be an engineer’s amusement or an outright hoax.

Development 

On 23 June 1942, the German Ministry of Armaments proposed a 1,000-tonne tank—the Landkreuzer P. 1000 Ratte. Adolf Hitler expressed interest in the project and the go-ahead was granted. In December, Krupp designed an even larger 1,500 tonne vehicle—the P. 1500 Monster. This "land cruiser” would have been a self-propelled platform for the 800 mm Dora/Schwerer Gustav K (E) gun artillery piece also made by Krupp—the heaviest artillery weapon ever constructed by shell weight and total gun weight, and the largest rifled cannon by calibre. 

The main armament could have been mounted without a rotating turret. Such a configuration would have allowed the P. 1500 to operate in a similar manner to the original 800 mm railroad gun and Karl 600 mm self-propelled mortars, launching shells without engaging the enemy with direct fire.

Issues 
Development of the Panzer VIII Maus had highlighted significant problems associated with very large vehicles, such as their destruction of roads/rails, their inability to use bridges and the difficulty of strategic transportation by road or rail. The bigger the vehicle, the bigger these problems became. In 1943, Albert Speer, the Minister for Armaments, cancelled both the Ratte and Monster projects.

See also 
 Crawler-transporter, the largest self-propelled land vehicles ever built
 Bagger 293, a bucket-wheel excavator and the largest land vehicle ever built by weight
 The Captain, Big Muskie and Bagger 288, previous land vehicle record holders for weight
 Overburden Conveyor Bridge F60, the largest land vehicle ever built by physical dimensions

References 
 
 Article about the Ratte, Monster and related
 Überschwere Panzerprojekte, Michael Fröhlich, Motorbuch Verlag, 2016 

Super-heavy tanks
World War II self-propelled artillery of Germany